Downtown Boys may refer to:

"Downtown Boys" (song), a song by Danish group Infernal
Downtown Boys (band), a band from Providence, Rhode Island